Serdtse ty moё is a studio album recorded by Sofia Rotaru in Germany in 2007. It was released for sale exclusively in Germany. Therefore, songs 1 through 5 (You Are My Heart, What's the Heart's Weather, Do Not Love, One in the World, Blizzard) and 18 (Blizzard) remain officially not released in Eastern Europe. This was a long waited album with new recent hits, namely yet unreleased, although aired in top radio charts, songs in Eastern Europe.

Track listing

Languages of performance 
All songs are performed in Russian language.

Production and technical details 
Album's description on the German site

See also 
You Are My Heart - song

2007 albums
Sofia Rotaru albums